Ronald Redrup (30 May 1935 – 5 April 2013) was a British boxer. He competed in the men's middleweight event at the 1956 Summer Olympics. He fought as Ron Redrup.

Redrup won the 1956 Amateur Boxing Association British middleweight title, when boxing out of the West Ham ABC.

References

External links
 

1935 births
2013 deaths
British male boxers
Olympic boxers of Great Britain
Boxers at the 1956 Summer Olympics
People from West Ham
Boxers from Greater London
England Boxing champions
Middleweight boxers